Mesahchie Glacier is in North Cascades National Park in the U.S. state of Washington, in a cirque to the northeast of Mesahchie Peak. Mesahchie Peak is the highest summit along a ridge known as Jagged Edge.

See also
List of glaciers in the United States

References

Glaciers of the North Cascades
Glaciers of Skagit County, Washington
Glaciers of Washington (state)